Ou Shizi (1234–1324) was a Song Dynasty scholar. A native of Chencun, Shunde in Guangdong province, he was known as "Mr. Dengzhou" (登洲先生) and was famous for his learnedness. His native village was renamed Dengzhou in his honour. He is the attributed author of the Three Character Classic, a Chinese classic text that embodied Confucius thought yet suitable for teaching young children.

External links

Song dynasty people
Chinese Confucianists
People from Shunde District
1234 births
1324 deaths